The Padua metropolitan area is the urban agglomeration of the city of Padua in Veneto, Italy.

It has been constituted as Metropolitan conference of Padua (act number 37 of 25 March 2003). It is not by now recognised by the Italian Republic among the città metropolitane (metropolitan cities) that will be instituted to replace province.

It is considered one of the main parts of the Venetian metropolitan area around Venice.

Metropolitan area

The Paduan metropolitan area is composed of the city of Padua and 15 towns from the Province of Padua, and one town from the Province of Venice, for a total of 394.011 inhabitants at the 2001 census, on a surface of 375,94 km², as shown in the following table (all data are referred to 2001 census):

References

Metropolitan areas of Italy
Padua